Vadeshwaram Temple is a Shiva temple located at Aroli in the Kannur district of Kerala, India.

Vadeshwaram is one among the 108 ancient Shiva temples in Kerala. It is also well known amongst the numerous Shiva temples in South India. It is built on top of a hill that looks like a mountain and is hence known by the nickname 'Kailasa of North Malabar'.

Vadeshwaram Temple is believed to be built by the Mushika king Vatukavarma in the Ashtadala (eight-petalled) style of architecture and is considered to be the only Indian temple to be built in this style. The primary deity of the temple is Shiva, while other deities related to Shiva such as Shasta and Dakshinamurthy are also worshipped. The temple is administered by the Malabar Devaswom Board.

Location
Vadeshwaram Temple is situated 150 metres eastward to the National Highway passing through Kannur. The temple is located at Aroli village in Pappinisseri Panchayat. It is built on top of the hill Keecheri which looks like a mountain and earns the temple its nickname 'Kailasa of North Malabar'. Calicut International Airport is currently the nearest airport, while Kannur International Airport is under construction near Mattannur.

History
The Vadeshwaram Temple is believed to have been built approximately 1500 years ago by the then king Vatukavarma, the 43rd ruler of Mushika dynasty. In Mushikavamsa Mahakavya, the poet Athula gives an account of Shiva and the Vateshwaram Temple.

The sanctum sanctorum of the Vadeshwaram Temple was constructed in a style known as Ashtadala (eight-petalled). Scholars state that this style is unique to the Vadeshwaram Temple and that this style does not exist in any other temple in India.

Worship
The primary deity of the Vadeshwaram Temple is Shiva. He is worshipped as the main deity in the form of Vadeshwarathappan. Other deities that are worshipped include deities related to Shiva such as Umamaheswara, Shasta, Dakshinamurthy and Kirathamurthy.

See also
Kottiyoor Temple
Rajarajeshwara Temple

References

External links
 

Hindu temples in Kannur district
Shiva temples in Kerala